The Visita de la Presentación was a Catholic visita located in Baja California Sur, Mexico. The visita was founded by Franciscan missionary Francisco Palóu in 1769 as an extension of Misión San Francisco Javier de Viggé-Biaundó.

Overview

The visita was abandoned in 1817. Substantial remnants of stone structures and the water system survive.

See also

 Spanish missions in Baja California Sur

References
 Vernon, Edward W. 2002. Las Misiones Antiguas: The Spanish Missions of Baja California, 1683-1855. Viejo Press, Santa Barbara, California.

Missions in Baja California Sur
Loreto Municipality (Baja California Sur)
1769 establishments in New Spain
Junípero Serra